Jørgen Bojsen-Møller (born 17 April 1954) is a Danish sailor and Olympic Champion. He competed at the 1988 Summer Olympics in Seoul and won a gold medal in the Flying Dutchman class, together with Christian Grønborg. At the 1992 Summer Olympics in Barcelona he received a bronze medal in the Flying Dutchman, together with his cousin Jens Bojsen-Møller.

References

External links
 
 
 

1954 births
Living people
Danish male sailors (sport)
Olympic sailors of Denmark
Olympic gold medalists for Denmark
Olympic bronze medalists for Denmark
Olympic medalists in sailing
Medalists at the 1992 Summer Olympics
Medalists at the 1988 Summer Olympics
Sailors at the 1980 Summer Olympics – Flying Dutchman
Sailors at the 1984 Summer Olympics – Flying Dutchman
Sailors at the 1988 Summer Olympics – Flying Dutchman
Sailors at the 1992 Summer Olympics – Flying Dutchman
Flying Dutchman class world champions
World champions in sailing for Denmark